Hadi Naraghi was an Iranian football player. He played for Taj (now known as Esteghlal) and he scored a goal in the derby against Persepolis FC.

Goal in Derby

In the Tehran derby on 1355-07-02 between Taj (now known as Esteghlal) and Persepolis FC, Hadi Naraghi scored a goal on the 26th minute to give Taj the lead. Shortly afterwards on the 40th minute, Ali Parvin scored an equaliser. The game finished 1–1.

1974 Iran International Tournament

Hadi Naraghi was in the Iran B squad for the 1974 Iran International Tournament. The 6 teams that took part were: Iran A, USSR U23, FK Teplice, Iran B, Zagłębie Sosnowiec and Tunisia national football team. Iran B lost in the semi-finals to FK Teplice

1976–77 Takht Jamshid Cup

Hadi Naraghi also took part in the 1976–77 Takht Jamshid Cup. He did well and scored 7 goals. He also helped his team, Taj come 4th that year.

References 

Iranian footballers
Living people
Esteghlal F.C. players
Association footballers not categorized by position
Year of birth missing (living people)